Pingxiang (萍乡市) is a prefecture-level city of Jiangxi, People's Republic of China (PRC). 

It may also refer to the following locations in the PRC:

Pingxiang, Guangxi (凭祥市), county-level city
Pingxiang, Pingxiang, Guangxi (凭祥镇), town in and seat of said city
Pingxiang County (平乡县), Hebei
Pingxiang, Hebei (平乡镇), town in said county